Lectavis is a genus of enantiornithine birds. Their fossil bones have been recovered from the Late Cretaceous (Maastrichtian, c. 70.6 – 66 mya) Lecho Formation at estancia El Brete, Argentina. The genus contains a single species, Lectavis bretincola.

Etymology 
It's naming means "Lecho Formation bird living at El Brete". Lectavis, after Latin lectus ("bed") = Spanish lecho + Latin avis, "bird". bretincola, after the type locality estancia El Brete + Latin incola, "inhabitant".

Description 
The presently only known fossil bones (PVL-4021-1) are mostly of the left tibiotarsus (lower leg) and tarsometatarsus (upper foot) of a single individual.

It possesses a hypotarsus, which it evolved autapomorphically from modern birds, as it covers the upper end of the second, not the third, toe's bones. This structure serves to attach and arrest the posterior cruciate ligament, which in turn prevents the lower and upper leg from shifting out of position during walking.

Classification 
It was a rather advanced species of enantiornithine and possibly quite closely related to Enantiornis and Avisaurus, but more likely closer to other Euenantiornithes (Sanz et al. 1995). Its exact relationships, as with most enantiornithine birds, are unresolved however.

Paleoecology 
Thus, it can be concluded that L. bretincola was a much more terrestrial species than its relative Yungavolucris brevipedalis which lived at the same time and place. Its habitat was a richly vegetated coastal area that was dotted by – possibly brackish – lakes or small rivers (Chiappe 1993), and it might thus be that the present species represents a case of parallel evolution with waders and similar semi-aquatic forms, or even a running bird similar to an oversized courser, and quite unlike anything living today.

References

Bibliography 
 Chiappe, Luis M. (1993): Enantiornithine (Aves) Tarsometatarsi from the Cretaceous Lecho Formation of Northwestern Argentina. American Museum Novitates 3083: 1-27. [English with Spanish abstract] PDF fulltext
 Sanz, José L., Chiappe, Luis M. & Buscalioni, Angela D. (1995): The Osteology of Concornis lacustris (Aves: Enantiornithes) from the Lower Cretaceous of Spain and a Reexamination of its Phylogenetic Relationships. American Museum Novitates 3133: 1-23. [English with Spanish abstract] PDF fulltext

Euenantiornitheans
Bird genera
Maastrichtian life
Cretaceous birds of South America
Cretaceous Argentina
Fossils of Argentina
Lecho Formation
Fossil taxa described in 1993